Ginny R. Favede is the 13th president of Wheeling University, in Wheeling, West Virginia, serving since October 2019.

Personal life
Originally from the Dayton, Ohio area, Favede is the youngest of ten siblings. She is married to Lee Favede, an optometrist who practices in Bridgeport, after the two met while in university. They have two children, Frank and Cecilia.

Early career 
Favede received her B.A. in Political Science from Ohio State University.

Favede served as a member of the St. Clairsville City Council and as a County Commissioner of Belmont County, Ohio. She unsuccessfully ran for a seat in the Ohio House of Representatives in 2016.

Career at Wheeling University 
Immediately prior to her presidency, Favede served as the university's chair of the board of trustees. After her appointment as president in October 2019, she has overseen the transition of Wheeling University from its former name of Wheeling Jesuit University, and introduced a number of directives aimed at stabilizing the tenuous financial position of the institution.

References 

Living people
Ohio State University alumni
Wheeling University faculty
Heads of universities and colleges in the United States
Year of birth missing (living people)